The Pakistan Penal Code, the main criminal code of Pakistan, penalizes blasphemy against any recognized religion, providing penalties ranging from a fine to death. According to the US Commission on International Religious Freedom, around 80 people are known to be incarcerated in Pakistan on blasphemy charges—half of those face life in prison or the death penalty. From 1967 to 2014, over 1,300 people were accused of blasphemy, with Muslims constituting most of those accused. According to human rights groups, blasphemy laws in Pakistan have been exploited not only for persecuting minorities but also for settling personal rivalries, often against other Muslims. Though no judicial execution has been carried out under these laws, many of those accused, their lawyers and any persons speaking against blasphemy laws and proceedings have become victims of lynchings or street vigilantism in Pakistan. More than 75 people were murdered for blasphemy between 1987 and 2017.

Context 
Many people accused of blasphemy have been murdered before their trials were over, and renowned figures who opposed the blasphemy law have been assassinated.
Since 1990, 62 people have been murdered following blasphemy accusations. According to one religious minority source, an accusation of blasphemy commonly exposes the accused, police, lawyers, and judges to harassment, threats, attacks and rioting. Critics complain that Pakistan's blasphemy laws are "overwhelmingly being used to persecute religious minorities and settle personal vendettas," but calls for change in blasphemy laws have been strongly resisted by Islamic parties - most prominently the Barelvi school of Islam. Many atheists in Pakistan have been lynched and imprisoned over unsubstantiated allegations of blasphemy. When the state initiated a full-fledged crackdown on atheism since 2017, it has become worse with secular bloggers being kidnapped and the government running advertisements urging people to identify blasphemers among them and the highest judges declaring such people to be terrorists.

Cases under blasphemy law have also been registered against Muslims who have harassed non-Muslims.

In 2020, the European Foundation for South Asian Studies (EFSAS) in a report entitled, Guilty until proven innocent: The sacrilegious nature of blasphemy laws Pakistan, recommended wide-ranging changes to Pakistan's laws and legal systems.

Laws
By its constitution, the official name of Pakistan is the "Islamic Republic of Pakistan" as of 1956. More than 96% of Pakistan's 167 million citizens (2008) are Muslims. 
Among countries with a Muslim majority, Pakistan has the strictest anti-blasphemy laws. The first purpose of those laws is to protect Islamic authority. By the constitution (Article 2), Islam is the state religion. By the constitution's Article 31, it is the country's duty to foster the Islamic way of life. By Article 33, it is the country's duty to discourage parochial, racial, tribal, sectarian, and provincial prejudices among the citizens. Under Article 10A of constitution it is also the state's duty to provide for the right of fair trial.

Religion-related offences on the territory of modern Pakistan were first codified by the British Raj in 1860, and were expanded in 1927. Pakistan inherited that legislation when it gained independence after the partition of India in 1947. Several sections of Pakistan's Penal Code comprise its blasphemy laws.

Development of Pakistani blasphemy laws
During the 1920s, after assassination of a publisher of a book named Rangila Rasul, published in Lahore, Punjab. In 1927, under pressure from the Muslim community, the administration of the British Raj enacted Hate Speech Law Section 295(A), a part of the Criminal Law Amendment Act XXV. This made it a criminal offence to insult the founders or leaders of any religious community. After creation of Pakistan in 1947, over the years many anti blasphemy laws and clauses were introduced in Pakistan's Penal Code.

Between 1980 and 1986, the military government of General Zia-ul Haq modified the existing blasphemy laws (which had been inherited from the colonial-era Indian Penal Code) to make them more severe, with a number of clauses being added by the government in order to "Islamicise" the laws and deny the Muslim character of the Ahmadi minority. Before 1986, only 14 cases of blasphemy were reported. Parliament through the Second Amendment to the Constitution on 7 September 1974, under Prime Minister Zulfiqar Ali Bhutto, declared Ahmadi Muslims as non-Muslims. In 1986 it was supplemented by a new blasphemy provision also applied to Ahmadi Muslims (See Persecution of Ahmadis). Between 1987 and 2017 at least 1,500 people were charged with blasphemy and at least 75 people involved in accusations of blasphemy were killed in Pakistan according to the Center for Social Justice.

Religious offences and punishments

Except for § 295-C, the provisions of § 295 require that an offence be a consequence of the accused's intent. 
(See below Sharia.)

§ 298 states:

Whoever, with the deliberate intention of wounding the religious feelings of any person, utters any word or makes any sound in the hearing of that person or makes any gesture in the sight of that person or places any object in the sight of that person, shall be punished with imprisonment of either description for a term which may extend to one year, or with fine, or with both.

Between 1986 and 2007, Pakistani authorities charged 647 people with blasphemy offences. with one source saying Fifty percent of these were non-Muslims, who represent only 3% of the national population. No judicial execution for blasphemy has ever occurred in Pakistan, but 20 of those charged were murdered.

The only law that may be useful in countering misuse of the blasphemy law is PPC 153 A (a), whoever "by words, either spoken or written, or by signs, or by visible representations or otherwise, promotes or incites, or attempts to promote or incite, on grounds of religion, race, place of birth, residence, language, caste or community or any other ground whatsoever, disharmony or feelings of enmity, hatred or ill-will between different religious, racial, language or regional groups or castes or communities" shall be fined and punished with imprisonment for a term that may extend to five years.

On 12 January 2011, Prime Minister of Pakistan Yousuf Raza Gilani once again said that there would be no amendments to the blasphemy law.

Sharia
The Federal Shariat Court (FSC) is a religious body which rules on whether any particular law is repugnant to the injunctions of Islam. If a law is repugnant to Islam, "the President in the case of a law with respect to a matter in the Federal Legislative List or the Concurrent Legislative List, or the Governor in the case of a law with respect to a matter not enumerated in either of those Lists, shall take steps to amend the law so as to bring such law or provision into conformity with the Injunctions of Islam" (Constitution, Article 203D). In October 1990, the FSC ruled that § 295-C was repugnant to Islam by permitting life imprisonment as an alternative to a death sentence. The Court said "the penalty for contempt of the Holy Prophet ... is death." The FSC ruled that, if the President did not take action to amend the law before 30 April 1991, then § 295-C would stand amended by its ruling.

Promptly after the FSC's ruling in 1990, Bishop Dani L. Tasleem filed an appeal in the Supreme Court of Pakistan, which has the power to overrule the FSC. In April 2009, the Shariat Appellate Bench of the Supreme Court considered the appeal. Deputy Attorney-General Agha Tariq Mehmood, who represented the federal government, said that the Shariat Appellate Bench dismissed the appeal because the appellant did not pursue it. The appellant did not present any argument on the appeal because the appellant, according to reports, was no longer alive. Consequently, it appears to be the law in Pakistan that persons convicted under § 295-C must be sentenced to death with or without a fine.

Vigilantism
Those who are accused of blasphemy may be subject to harassment, threats, and attacks. Police, lawyers, and judges may also be subject to harassment, threats, and attacks when blasphemy is an issue. Those accused of blasphemy are subject to immediate incarceration, and most accused are denied bail to forestall mob violence. It is common for those accused of blasphemy to be put in solitary confinement for their protection from other inmates and guards. Like those who have served a sentence for blasphemy, those who are acquitted of blasphemy usually go into hiding or leave Pakistan. Pakistan's blasphemy laws are known to be widely abused by those seeking personal gain from those accused as evidenced by the Imran Ghafur Masih case study. Masih was accused and sentenced to life in prison under section 295B of the blasphemy laws after his neighbor manipulated and tricked him into unknowingly throwing away a copy of the Quran, because the neighbor wanted to gain Masih's storefront real estate.

United Nations
Pakistan's support of blasphemy regulation has caused it to be active in the international arena in promoting global limitations on freedom of religion or belief and limitations on freedom of expression. In March 2009, Pakistan presented a resolution to the United Nations Human Rights Council in Geneva which calls upon the world to formulate laws against the defamation of religion. See blasphemy.

Internet censorship

In May 2010, Pakistan blocked access to Facebook because the website hosted a page called Everybody Draw Muhammad Day. Pakistan lifted the block after Facebook prevented access to the page. In June 2010, Pakistan blocked seventeen websites for hosting content that the authorities considered offensive to Muslims. At the same time, Pakistan began to monitor the content of Google, Yahoo, YouTube, Amazon and Bing.

In January 2021, an Anti-Terrorism Court (ATC) convicted and sentenced three men to death for sharing blasphemous content on social media. A fourth accused in the same case, one Anwaar Ahmed, Professor of Urdu language, was sentenced to 10 years imprisonment, along with a fine of Rs100,000. He had been accused of disseminating controversial blasphemous views during a lecture at the Islamabad Model College. During the trial, court did not admit witnesses for the defence because they were blood relatives of the accused.

Public opinion

On 19 March 2014, The Nation polled its readers and later reported that 68% of Pakistanis believe the blasphemy law should be repealed. On the other hand, the International Crisis Group reports that 

Pakistani human rights activists say that charges of blasphemy are being used to harass minorities and settle personal conflicts. Harshil Mehta, South Asia's political observer, has commented that it is "an urgent need to replace these laws" in his article in Outlook. If the Islamic Republic, he wrote, "wants to prove itself as a haven for religious freedom, then it must ban these regressive laws."

Selected cases

Arrests and death sentences issued for blasphemy laws in Pakistan go back to the late 1980s and early 90s. Despite the implementation of these laws, no one has yet been executed by the order of the courts or governments as to date, only imprisoned to await a verdict or killed at the hands of felons who were convinced that the suspects were guilty.

According to Sohail Khattak and Noman Ahmed of 'The Express Tribune, Pakistan', in 2014 Professor Dr Muhammad Shakil Auj, the then officiating dean of Islamic Studies Faculty at the University of Karachi was gunned down. Police investigators suspected likely involvement of his own colleagues including one previous dean in texting and circulating blasphemy charges with message 'sar tan se juda (Beheading is the punishment)' against Auj, being not happy with the orientation of his research.

Some of the widely reported cases were:
 In February 2023, a Muslim man in his mid-30s was lynched by an angry mob after being arrested by police on the charge of blasphemy. Muhammad Waris was arrested in the city of Nankana Sahib in Punjab before the mob stormed the police station were he was being held. Video of the incident has now been posted to social media, with the vision showing that the man was dragged out of the station by his legs before being stripped naked and beaten with metal rods and sticks.
 In December 2017, a 58-year-old man accused of blasphemy was freed after spending over nine years in jail. Bahawalnagar District court and Lahore High Court sentenced the man to life imprisonment which was overruled by Supreme Court of Pakistan as the evidence used was not in accordance with the Evidence Act
In July 2017, Faisal Mahmood was charged with blasphemy law U/S 295C by the court of magistrate special judicial Gujarat and could be sentence to death.
 In March 2017, Prime Minister of Pakistan Nawaz Sharif supported a crackdown on blasphemous material posted on social media and described blasphemy as an "unpardonable offence". Shortly after, Pakistani blogger Ayaz Nizami, founder of realisticapproach.org, an Urdu website about atheism, and Vice President of Atheist & Agnostic Alliance Pakistan, was detained under the charges of blasphemy and could face the death penalty.
 In January, 2014 Muhammad Asghar, a 70-year-old British man from Edinburgh, was convicted of blasphemy and sentenced to death by a court in Rawalpindi. Asghar had initially been arrested in 2010 after sending letters in which he declared himself a prophet, and had lived in Pakistan for several years prior to his arrest and trial. Javed Gul, a government prosecutor, disclosed to Agence France Presse that, "Asghar claimed to be a prophet even inside the court. He confessed it in front of the judge." Asghar's lawyers had argued during the trial that he should be granted leniency on account of a history of mental illness, but a medical panel later rejected this argument after reviewing his case.
 In September 2013, a Lahore-based woman Salma Fatima was arrested by police after she distributed pamphlets declaring herself a prophet.
 In October 2012 teacher Arfa Iftikhar was forced into hiding after a furious mob stormed Farooqi Girls High School in the eastern city of Lahore over a piece of homework she set that allegedly contained derogatory references to the Islamic prophet Mohammad.
 Rimsha Masih (some reports use the name "Rifta" or "Riftah") is a Pakistani child who was arrested in Islamabad by Pakistani police in August 2012 and who could face the death penalty for blasphemy for allegedly desecrating pages of the Quran (or a book containing verses from the Quran) by burning. She is a member of Pakistan's Christian minority.
 In July 2011 Muhammad Ajmal escaped the raid of a local religious group in Rawalpindi, who later announced that anti-Islamic material and blasphemous material against the prophet of Islam was found in his apartment, both printed and on his laptop. Ajmal disappeared in July 2011.
 On 12 December 2011, a teacher, Shahid Nadeem, in the missionary school of Faisalabad, was accused by Qari Muhammad Afzal (a member of Lashkar-e-Jhangvi, a banned organisation) who registered an FIR on 28 December 2011 at the local police station claiming that the culprit had deliberately torn the pages of Quran and burned them.
 On 2 March 2011 Shahbaz Bhatti, Pakistan's Federal Minister for Minorities Affairs (a Roman Catholic member of the National Assembly), was killed by gunmen in Islamabad as he was travelling to work, a few weeks after he had vowed to defy death threats over his efforts to reform Pakistan's blasphemy laws.
 In November 2010, Asia Bibi was sentenced to death by hanging on a charge of blasphemy. She said the accusation was false and was simply revenge after an argument in a berry field over drinking water. The case sparked international reactions, and in 2018, thanks to international advocacy, Bibi was acquitted of the blasphemy charges after spending 8 years on death row. Punjab Governor Salman Taseer was shot dead by his security guard for supporting Asia Bibi. Salman Taseer had visited Bibi in Jail and had held a press conference with her. He had told media that she would be released soon and the President of Pakistan will soon annul her death sentence. This triggered mass protests in Pakistan with many imams of local mosques claiming that Salman Taseer had defied Mohammed and should be sentenced to death for it. Taseer was later assassinated in early 2011.
 In July 2010, a trader in Faisalabad complained that one of his employees had been handed a pamphlet which contained disrespectful remarks about Muhammad. According to the police, the pamphlet appeared to have the signatures and addresses of Pastor Rashid Emmanuel and his brother Sajid, who were Christians. The brothers were shot and killed while being escorted by the police from a district court. Both had denied the charge of blasphemy. Allama Ahmed Mian Hammadi, a Pakistani Muslim cleric, claimed that Shahbaz Bhatti, Pakistan's Federal Minister for Minorities, had himself committed blasphemy by branding the murdered Christian brothers as victims of Pakistan's blasphemy laws.
 On 9 July 2009, a FIR was registered against two teenager brothers, complainant falsely accusing them that they had spoken against Muhammad and this family had to leave the country for their safety. On 30 July 2009, hundreds of members of Sipah-e-Sahaba and International Khatm-e-Nabuwat 'IKNM' the banned Muslim organisations, torched the Christian homes and killed Christians in the Punjabi city of Gojra Faisalabad and in the nearby village of Korian, District Faisalabad. The professed reason for the violence was that a Christian had defiled and spoke against Muhammad.
 On 22 January 2009, Hector Aleem a Christian Human Rights Activist in Pakistan was arrested on a blasphemy charge. According to the FIR, someone sent a blasphemous text message to the leader of Sunni Tehreek. Hector Aleem was arrested because the sender had once contacted him. Hector Aleem, the Chairman of Peace Worldwide, had been working for a church in Islamabad which was demolished by the CDA (Capital Development Authority) for having been built illegally. When Hector Aleem objected to the destruction of the church he was faced with several threats and lawsuits ranging from fraud to criminal charges. He fought all of them in the courts and proved his innocence. He also faced several assassination attempts. Hector Aleem was eventually arrested on the charge of blasphemy.
 In February 2008, Special Rapporteurs of the United Nations Human Rights Council reminded Pakistan's representative of the matter regarding Raja Fiaz, Muhammad Bilal, Nazar Zakir Hussain, Qazi Farooq, Muhammad Rafique, Muhammad Saddique and Ghulam Hussain. According to the allegations received, the men were members of the Mehdi Foundation International (MFI), a multi-faith institution utilising the name of Riaz Ahmed Gohar Shahi. They were arrested on 23 December 2005 in Wapda Town. The police confiscated posters on which Gohar Shahi was shown as "Imam Mehdi." On 13 July 2006, the Anti-Terrorism Court No. 1 in Lahore sentenced each accused to five years of imprisonment, inter alia, under § 295-A for having outraged others' religious feelings. Since 27 August 2006, the seven men have been detained in Sahiwal Jail, Punjab, where they were forced to parade naked, and were suspended from the ceiling and beaten. For this reason, they were constantly threatened and intimidated by prison staff as well as by other detainees.
 Christians and Muslims in Pakistan condemned Dan Brown's novel The Da Vinci Code as blasphemous. On 3 June 2006, Pakistan banned the film. Culture Minister Ghulam Jamal said: "Islam teaches us to respect all the prophets of God Almighty and degradation of any prophet is tantamount to defamation of the rest."
 On 11 August 2005, Judge Arshad Noor Khan of the Anti-Terrorist Court found (another) Younus Shaikh guilty of defiling a copy of the Quran, outraging religious feelings, and propagating religious hatred among society. Shaikh's conviction occurred because he wrote a book: Shaitan Maulvi (Satanic Cleric). The book said stoning to death (Rajam) as a punishment for adultery was not mentioned in the Quran. The book said also that four historical imams (religious leaders) were Jews. The judge imposed upon Shaikh a fine of 100,000 rupees, and sentenced him to spend his life in jail.
 In October 2000, Pakistani authorities charged M. Younus Shaikh, a physician, with blasphemy on account of remarks that students claimed he made during a lecture. The students alleged that, inter alia, Shaikh had said Muhammad's parents were non-Muslims because they died before Islam existed. A judge ordered that Shaikh pay a fine of 100,000 rupees, and that he be hanged. On 20 November 2003, a court retried the matter and acquitted Shaikh, who fled Pakistan for Switzerland soon thereafter.
 The police arrested Ayub Masih, a Pakistani Christian bricklayer for blasphemy on 14 October 1996 and jailed him for violation of § 295-C. Muhammad Akram, a Muslim neighbour to Masih, complained to the police that Masih had said Christianity was right, and Masih had suggested that Akram read Salman Rushdie's Satanic Verses. The same day that Masih was arrested, Muslim villagers forced the entire Christian population of Masih's village (fourteen families) to leave the village. Masih's family had applied under a government program that gave housing plots to landless people. Local landlords resented Masih's application because the landlords had been able to oblige landless Christians to work in the fields in exchange for a place to live. Masih's application gave him a way out of his subservience to the landlords. Upon Masih's arrest, the authorities gave Masih's plot to Akram. Akram shot and injured Masih in the halls of the Session Court at Sahiwal on 6 November 1997. Four assailants attacked Masih in jail. The authorities took no action against Akram or against the other assailants. On 20 April 1998, Judge Abdul Khan sentenced Masih to death and levied a fine of 100,000 rupees. Two judges of the Lahore High Court heard Masih's appeal on 24 July 2001. Shortly thereafter, the judges affirmed the judgment of the trial court. On 16 August 2002, the Supreme Court of Pakistan set aside the judgment of the lower courts. The Supreme Court noted Akram's acquisition of Masih's property and concluded the case had been fabricated for personal gain. The court also noted other breaches in the law of due process.
 In first of its kind case, a 30-year-old Shiite Taimoor Raza has been sentenced to death by Anti-Terror Court, for posting blasphemous content on Facebook. He was booked in 2016 after he engaged in sectarian debate with a counter-terrorism official on Facebook.
In November 2016, a Facebook campaign was launched by the followers of Khadim Hussain Rizvi, against Malik Shahrukh, a PhD researcher who was previously associated with an Islamabad-based diplomatic news publication. Malik was accused of calling the Quran "an ordinary book, produced by Mohammad for economic and political purposes." A video of the local Imam of Sargodha, in which he incited people during the Friday sermon to kill Malik, went viral. Several applications were made to the authorities against Malik, demanding that he be sentenced to death. Authorities could not arrest Malik because he was not in Pakistan at the time. Sources claim that Malik is being framed for criticizing Tahreek-e-Labbaik and its chief.
 In 2019, Junaid Hafeez, formerly a lecturer at Bahauddin Zakariya University in Multan, was sentenced to death for blasphemy after being arrested in 2013 and accused of insulting the prophet Muhammad on Facebook. Hafeez's first attorney, Rashid Rehman, was murdered in his office in 2014 after agreeing to represent Hafeez. The verdict prompted an outcry from human rights groups; Amnesty International called it a "'vile and gross miscarriage of justice."
In June 2020, an assistant professor of the Shah Abdul Latif University namely Sajid Soomro was arrested under contested blasphemy charges, allegedly he just claimed Islam being male dominated religion. Another professor from Sindh University Dr Arfana Mallah came under severe pressure for supporting and terming blasphemy law to be unfair. Various NGOs including Human Rights Commission of Pakistan condemned misuse of blasphemy law in case of professor Sajid Soomro.
In July 2020, there was an attempt by Qamar Riaz, a local leader of the ruling party Pakistan Tehreek-e-Insaf in Narowal, to file a blasphemy case against former Minister for Foreign Affairs Khawaja Muhammad Asif for allegedly saying "Islam and all religions are equal" in a speech in Pakistan's National Assembly. United States Committee on International Religious Freedoms expressed grave concerns against the same.
In August 2020, at least 42 cases pertaining to blasphemy were registered across Pakistan in a single month, Most of those accused of blasphemy were associated to the Shia community, who have been booked under 295-A and 298 sections of the Pakistan Penal Code for allegedly insulting the companions of Muhammad
In September 2020, a court in Lahore, Pakistan, sentenced a Christian man, Asif Pervaiz, to death for sending a "blasphemous" message to his former supervisor at work in 2013. The defendant said that his supervisor had tried to convert him to Islam, which he refused to do; however, the court rejected his testimony.

See also
 Apostasy in Islam
 Asia Bibi blasphemy case
 Court system of Pakistan
Criticism of Pakistan
 Pakistan National Commission for Minorities

 Forced conversion to Islam in Pakistan
 Freedom of religion in Pakistan
 Islam in Pakistan
 Islamization in Pakistan
 Pakistan Penal Code
 Religion in Pakistan
 Religious discrimination in Pakistan
Sectarian violence in Pakistan
Superstitions in Muslim Societies 
Women related laws in Pakistan

References

Further reading

Court accepts petition not to change Islamic blasphemy law, Aftab Alexander Mughal
On Pakistani Blasphemy law, Masood Ashraf Raja 
Pakistan: Religious freedom in the shadow of extremism, CSW briefing, 2011
Blasphemy Laws in Pakistan
Once a blasphemer always a blasphemer
Pakistan: Murderer Revered for Defending Blasphemy Law
Abbas, Shemeem Burney. Pakistan's Blasphemy Laws: From Islamic Empires to the Taliban. N.p., University of Texas Press, 2013.
Pakistan: The Mullahs and the Military. Belgium, ICG, 2003. Page 22

Pakistan
Pakistan
Censorship in Islam
Islamic extremism
Law about religion in Pakistan

Persecution by Muslims
Political repression in Pakistan
Religious discrimination in Pakistan
Pakistan